Prothalotia suturalis is a species of sea snail, a marine gastropod mollusk in the family Trochidae, the top snails.

Description
The height of the shell attains 8 mm, its diameter also 8 mm. The small, solid, imperforate shell has a pyramidal shape. The apex is eroded, but the whorls apparently number six. They are flattened, slightly gradate, the body whorl descending a little at the aperture. The colour is pale yellow, tessellated with small, longitudinal undulating purple spots. The sculpture: low, flat-topped spiral ribs equal to the intervening spaces, on the body whorl twelve, of which half are basal. The aperture is subquadrate. The columella is short and terminates below in a blunt tubercle. The sutures are impressed. The base of the shell is flat. The inner lip is turned inwards and is greenish.

Distribution
This marine species is endemic to Australia and occurs off Northern Queensland and in the Gulf of Carpentaria.

References

Further reading 

 Adams, A. 1853. Contributions towards a monograph of the Trochidae, a family of gastropodous Mollusca. Proceedings of the Zoological Society of London 1851(19): 150–192

suturalis
Gastropods of Australia
Gastropods described in 1853